is a private university in Moroyama, Saitama, Japan, established in 2007.

The Nihon Institute of Medical Science was established in 1918 as Josai Business School. In 1984, it was reorganized into the Josai College of Medical Arts & Sciences., a vocational college, and took its present name in 2007. It is located next to Josai University in neighboring Sakado, Saitama.

The school has a Department of Radiological Technology, Department of Nursing, Department of Physical Therapy, Department of Occupational Therapy and Department of Clinical Engineering.

External links
 Official website 

Educational institutions established in 1918
Private universities and colleges in Japan
Universities and colleges in Saitama Prefecture
1918 establishments in Japan
Moroyama, Saitama